"Vandaag" is a song by Dutch producer Bakermat. It was released in August 2012 as a single and reached the top ten in Austria, Belgium, France, and the Netherlands.

It was re-released by Sony in 2014 as "One Day (Vandaag)" becoming a hit in several European countries.

Content
The song consists of an integrated sample of the "I Have a Dream" speech by Martin Luther King Jr.

Track list
Promo – digital (27 August 2012)
"Vandaag" (5:22)
"Zomer" (6:47)

CD Maxi – Sony release (25 April 2014)
"One Day (Vandaag)" (radio edit) (3:41)
"One Day (Vandaag)" (original mix) (5:24)

Charts

Weekly charts

Year-end charts

Certifications

References

2012 singles
2012 songs
Songs against racism and xenophobia
Songs about Martin Luther King Jr.
SNEP Top Singles number-one singles
Tropical house songs
Sony Music singles